The terms Aethiops, Ethiop, or Ethiope are archaic words for a dark-skinned person. It may refer to:

 Aethiopia, an ancient term for parts of Africa
 Æthiops mineral, a form of cinnabar
 Ethiops martial, or wüstite, a mineral
 Black people in Ancient Roman history
 People of Ethiopia

See also

 Aethiopis, a lost epic of ancient Greek literature
 
 Ethiopia (disambiguation)